Wendy Winsted was a folk singer/writer, author, and physician (University of Cincinnati School of Medicine 1985) who has been credited with popularizing ferrets as pets in the United States in the mid 1970s. Winsted worked on and perfected the procedure for de-scenting young ferrets (by removing the anal scent sac and neutering males to eliminate their odor). She introduced ferrets to numerous celebrities such as Dick Smothers and David Carradine and appeared on television numerous times with her own ferrets.

Winsted taught her method of de-scenting ferrets to several breeders and farms across the United States, thereby making de-scented ferrets the standard for being sold at pet stores.

She died in the 1990s from cancer.

Works 
Ferrets: A Complete Introduction - TFH Publications 
Ferrets In Your Home - TFH Publications 

American veterinarians
Year of death missing
Year of birth missing
Women veterinarians
University of Cincinnati College of Medicine alumni